KPCZ may refer to:

 Waupaca Municipal Airport (ICAO code KPCZ)
 KPCZ-FM, a radio station (106.7 FM) licensed to serve Rayne, Louisiana, United States